Marauders is a 2016 American crime film directed by Steven C. Miller and written by Michael Cody and Chris Sivertson. The film stars Christopher Meloni, Bruce Willis, Dave Bautista, and Adrian Grenier. Meloni plays an FBI agent investigating a series of brutal bank robberies that seem to be personally targeting a ruthless CEO played by Willis. Lionsgate Premiere released the film on July 1.

Plot
In Cincinnati, four masked robbers get away with $3 million in cash from Hubert National Bank after the crew's leader executes manager Steven Hutchinson point-blank. FBI Special Agent Jonathan Montgomery heads the joint robbery-homicide investigation with Cincinnati PD. Forensics techs find a print matched to a dead Army Ranger named TJ Jackson. According to the official report, in 2011, TJ's unit went rogue, capturing civilian Alexander Hubert to collect a ransom. The exchange went awry and Alexander and the Rangers were killed by a Special Forces team. TJ's body was never recovered. As the sole heir, Jeffrey Hubert, Alexander's brother, became president of Hubert International. By tracking the serial numbers, the FBI discovers the robbers donated the money to a City Mission charity fund.

In a second heist at a different Hubert bank location, the robbers steal cash and the contents of personal safe deposit boxes belonging to Hubert and Ohio Senator Cook. David Dagley, a member of Hubert's security detail, is lured to the bank then stabbed to death in an ambush. The killer leaves a bullet with TJ's fingerprint on it. Dagley was Commanding Officer of the Rangers who snatched Alexander Hubert but didn't take part in the ransom scheme. The getaway vehicle is discovered registered to TJ's brother, James. Montgomery receives photo evidence of an apparent homosexual affair between Hubert and Cook, and the robbers attempt to persuade Montgomery into investigating Hubert's corruption. Converging on the Main Branch for the third robbery, the gang surprise the FBI during an interview with Hubert. High-powered rifle firefights erupt across the lobby as the men engage in close quarters combat. One thief is killed, and the three others retreat into the downtown traffic. Victims Hutchinson and Dagley are found to be old members of an elite platoon with Cook.

Montgomery is sent a file stolen from Hubert detailing the conspiracy to commit murder and military cover-up. It leaks to the media, and the truth finally outs: Hubert conspired with Cook to prevent Alexander from taking over the company. They briefed the Ranger unit with false mission intel of a terrorist threat in Costa Rica. The Rangers sent in were then assessed as rogue agents and ambushed by a Special Forces team with no knowledge of the Rangers' innocence. TJ was the sole survivor, saved by then-Special Forces sniper Wells.

With his assets frozen, Hubert hastily makes large unauthorized cash withdrawals to flee the country. TJ is tracked by the FBI to a concert venue and taken into custody. FBI Special Agent Wells is revealed to be the thief crew leader, and three special forces members that attacked TJ's squad are accomplices. He planned the heists as vengeance for the Ranger massacre he took part in. Recalling a key detail in a map location, detective Mims predicts Wells as the thief and arrives as Wells preps to leave the stash spot with the cash. Tormented by a guilty conscience and his wife's terminal cancer prognosis, Mims pleads with Wells to allow him to return the stolen money and atone. Wells tries to reason with Mims but kills him as Mims raises his weapon.

Some time later, Montgomery tracks Hubert to Tijuana, Mexico. He finds Wells preparing to kill Hubert in a restaurant and suggests Wells absolve his transgressions by using the stolen money to help others. Montgomery takes a seat at Hubert's table, sips wine in remembrance of his wife, then stabs Hubert with a concealed blade. Wells shoots Hubert's bodyguard, shares a glance with Montgomery, and leaves.

Cast
 Christopher Meloni as Special Agent Jonathan Montgomery 
 Bruce Willis as Jeffrey Hubert
 Dave Bautista as Agent Stockwell
 Adrian Grenier as Special Agent Wells
 Texas Battle as Ranger TJ Jackson
 Johnathon Schaech as Detective Brian Mims
 Lydia Hull as Special Agent Lydia Chase
 Tyler Jon Olson as Detective Zach Derohan
 Christopher Rob Bowen as Bradley Teegan
 Danny A. Abeckaser as Detective Antonio Leon
 Richie Chance as Command Officer David Dagley
 Tara Holt as Reporter Vanessa Adler
 Carolyn Alise as Martha
 Chris Hill as James Jackson
 Jesse Pruett as Carl Bartender

Production
On September 9, 2015, it was announced that Steven C. Miller would be directing a bank robbery film Marauders based on the script by Michael Cody and Chris Sivertson. Bruce Willis, Christopher Meloni, and Dave Bautista would star in the film, which Emmett/Furla/Oasis Films would finance and produce while Lionsgate Premiere would release it. Lydia Hull, Tyler Olson, Christopher Rob Bowen, and Danny A. Abeckaser would also star in the film. Randall Emmett and George Furla would produce through Emmett/Furla/Oasis Films along with Joshua Harris and Rosie Charbonneau through 4th Wall Entertainment. On September 25, 2015, Adrian Grenier joined the film.

Principal photography on the film began on September 25, 2015, in Cincinnati, Ohio. First-day filming took place at the Dixie Terminal building. On September 26, 2015, filming was underway at the Stock Yard Bank & Trust, which was transformed into Hubert National Bank. Filming also took place in Downtown Cincinnati and Over-the-Rhine through October 16.

Release
Lionsgate Premiere released the film on July 1, 2016.

Box office
As of September 23, 2018, Marauders grossed $1,024,158 in Portugal, Argentina, China, and the Netherlands.

Reception
On Rotten Tomatoes the film has a rating of 24% based on 21 reviews and an average rating of 4.1/10.  The critical consensus reads: "From its clichéd story to Bruce Willis' rote performance, Marauders is a crime thriller content to settle for merely competent – a goal it all too rarely achieves." On Metacritic the film has a score of 42 out of 100 based on six critics, indicating "mixed or average reviews".  Frank Scheck of The Hollywood Reporter called it a "by-the-numbers B-movie" with slow pacing and a convoluted plot.  Owen Gleiberman of Variety wrote that the film's complex plot makes less sense as it progresses because the explanations are so unbelievable.

References

External links
 

2016 films
2016 action thriller films
2016 crime action films
2016 crime thriller films
2016 independent films
2010s heist films
American films about revenge
American action thriller films
American crime action films
American crime thriller films
American heist films
Films about bank robbery
Films about the Federal Bureau of Investigation
Films directed by Steven C. Miller
Films set in Cincinnati
Films set in Tijuana
Films shot in Ohio
Lionsgate films
MoviePass Films films
2010s English-language films
2010s American films